Pelican Park High School is a public school owned by the Western Cape Education Department. The current principal is Mr. Carder Tregonning.

High schools in South Africa